Dennis Ziegenhorn (born December 10, 1947) is an American politician who served in the Missouri House of Representatives from 1981 to 1995.

References

1947 births
Living people
Democratic Party members of the Missouri House of Representatives